John Llewellyn Fenlon (December 7, 1909 – September 2, 2000) was an American football coach.  He served as the head football coach at the University of Richmond in 1942 and again from 1946 to 1947, compiling a record of 12–15–3.  Fenlon attended George Washington University, where he lettered in football, basketball, and baseball in the early 1930s.  He died on September 2, 2000.

Head coaching record

References

External links
 

1909 births
2000 deaths
American men's basketball players
George Washington Colonials baseball players
George Washington Colonials football players
George Washington Colonials men's basketball players
Richmond Spiders football coaches